The Cattle Baron's Ball in Dallas is a single-night fundraiser for cancer research benefiting the American Cancer Society.  The first Cattle Baron's Ball was held in 1974 at the Star Brand Ranch and raised $56,000.  In 2009, the Cattle Baron's Ball at South Fork Ranch raised $3.5 million.  As of 2019, the Cattle Baron's Ball has raised more than $81 million for cancer research. It's become the world’s largest single-night fundraiser for the American Cancer Society.

Country music's most revered performers have entertained at the ball throughout its 35+ year history, including Tammy Wynette, Johnny Cash, Willie Nelson, George Strait, Waylon Jennings, Brooks & Dunn, Clint Black, Dwight Yoakam, Big & Rich, Toby Keith, Sugarland and Brad Paisley, among many others.  More than $32 million of the money raised has been allocated to UT Southwestern Medical Center. The Ball typically holds a raffle featuring luxury items donated by sponsors and partners, which have included Park Place Porsche, Christie's, Winstar World Casino, and Eisemann Jewelers.  

Given the size, time of year (autumn) and outdoor location of the event, in the past attendees and organizers often dealt with inclement weather and muddy roads on the night of the Ball.  The 2009 Cattle Baron's Ball was particularly plagued with limos and other vehicles that became entrenched in the mud; it was estimated that between 500 and 1000 vehicles required towing.

References

External links 
 American Cancer Society's detailed listing of the Dallas Cattle Baron's Ball
 Cattle Baron’s: The Great Mud Ball of 2009 | D Magazine's blog Sweet Charity
 Long Live The Cattle Baron’s Ball 2009 | Society Stylist (blog)

Culture of Dallas
Cancer fundraisers
American Cancer Society